is a Japanese skier. He competed in the Nordic combined events at the 1976 Winter Olympics and the 1980 Winter Olympics.

References

External links
 

1949 births
Living people
Japanese male Nordic combined skiers
Olympic Nordic combined skiers of Japan
Nordic combined skiers at the 1976 Winter Olympics
Nordic combined skiers at the 1980 Winter Olympics
Sportspeople from Niigata Prefecture